Stop AAPI Hate is a nonprofit organization that runs the Stop AAPI Hate Reporting Center, which tracks incidents of hate and discrimination against Asian Americans and Pacific Islanders (AAPI) in the United States. The organization was formed in 2020 in response to racist attacks on the Asian community as a result of the COVID-19 pandemic. Stop AAPI Hate’s approach is to focus on working to end all forms of structural racism leveled at the communities of color to truly be able to effectively address anti-Asian racism.

History 
Stop AAPI Hate was founded by a consortium of three  groups: the Asian Pacific Policy and Planning Council (A3PCON), Chinese for Affirmative Action (CAA), and the Asian American Studies Department (AAS) at the San Francisco State University, under the leadership of Manjusha P. Kulkarni, Cynthia Choi, and Russell Jeung. The consortium began its action in January 2020 as a response to the impact of the COVID-19 pandemic on Asian Americans, specifically news accounts of incidents of racially motivated violence. The group takes a grassroots approach to gathering data and providing these data to the general public and other advocacy groups. 

The group began its focus on incidents occurring in California. Their researchers initially analyzed data from the end of January 2020 though the end of February 2020 from news sources reporting on xenophobia and COVID-19. The group then approached the governor of California and the state's Attorney General's Office requesting that state agencies respond to the increasing threat of discrimination. Although the governor and others in government decried the racism, they did not form a reporting center. Stop AAPI Hate subsequently formed a non-governmental community-based reporting system called the Stop AAPI Hate Reporting Center.

On February 23, 2021, the California legislature enacted the AB 85 law which includes funding of $1.4 million specifically to support Stop AAPI Hate's website, analysis and research.

The group operates a website which allows users to report an incident. The website also is a clearinghouse for reports and press releases with data generated from the reporting.

Time magazine has named Kulkarni, Choi, and Jeung among the 100 most influential people of 2021, for they "have locked arms with other BIPOC organizations to find restorative justice measures so that civil rights—for all vulnerable groups—receive the protection they deserve."

See also
 Black Lives Matter
 Idle No More
 Asian American activism
 The Asian American Foundation (TAAF)

References

External links 
 

Asian-American issues
Anti-racist organizations in the United States
Civil rights organizations in the United States
Organizations established for the COVID-19 pandemic
Organizations established in 2020
2020 establishments in California
Asian-American-related controversies
Anti-Asian sentiment in the United States